Ammar Mahmood (4 April 1979 – 29 October 2021) was a Pakistani first-class cricketer who played for Faisalabad and Pakistan Television between 2007 and 2015. He also played for Cleckheaton in the Bradford Premier League in England. He died from stomach cancer at the age of 42.

References

External links
 

1979 births
2021 deaths
Pakistani cricketers
Faisalabad cricketers
Cricketers from Faisalabad
Pakistan Television cricketers
Faisalabad Wolves cricketers